() is a mud adobe-built outdoor oven used by Native Americans and early settlers of North America. Originally introduced to the Iberian Peninsula by the Moors, it was quickly adopted and carried to all Spanish-occupied lands. The  has a beehive shape and uses wood as the heat source. When cooking meats, the oven is fired to a "white hot" temperature (approximately ), the coals are moved to the back of the oven, and the meats placed inside. The smoke-hole and door are sealed with mud. A twenty-one-pound turkey will take 2 to 3 hours to cook.

 is the usual Spanish word for 'oven' or 'furnace', and derives from the Latin word .

"Young women must master the art of using the oven to bake piki, a tasty, delicate paper-thin bread made of cornmeal, before they are considered fit for marriage."

See also

Adobe bread
List of ovens
Primitive clay oven
Kemence

References

Earth oven
Fireplaces
Cooking appliances
Barbecue
Garden features